Michael Mayr (born August 20, 1984 in Linz) is an Austrian former professional ice hockey defenceman who played his entire career with the EHC Black Wings Linz in the Erste Bank Eishockey Liga.  He played for his hometown team from 2001 to 2014 totalling 555 games for them in the EBEL.

References

External links
 

1984 births
Austrian ice hockey defencemen
EHC Black Wings Linz players
Living people